Otter Creek is a stream in the U.S. state of Iowa. It is a tributary to Pechman Creek.

Otter Creek was named for the North American river otters once found there.

References

Rivers of Johnson County, Iowa
Rivers of Washington County, Iowa
Rivers of Iowa